Bago-Kusuntu (dialects Bago, Kusuntu) is a Gur language of Togo.

References

Languages of Togo
Gurunsi languages